John Henry McCooey (June 18, 1864 – January 21, 1934) was an American politician who was a political boss in the Democratic Party political machine of Brooklyn. McCooey served as chair of the Kings County Democratic Party from 1910 until his death in 1934.

McCooey was born in Williamsburg, Brooklyn, in 1864. He was the oldest of six children. He developed the Madison Club, which became the strongest political organization in Kings County. At an early age, McCooey became friends with John Francis Hylan, a future Mayor of New York City.

McCooey married Catherine I. Sesnon on January 17, 1899. McCooey served as secretary and president of the New York City Civil Service Commission from 1899 through 1903. He succeeded Hugh McLaughlin as Brooklyn boss in 1904. He was named to the Executive Committee of the county in 1909.

McCooey joined with Tammany Hall in 1925. In 1932, McCooey was chosen by the New York delegation to succeed Norman E. Mack as a member of the Democratic National Committee. McCooey and Tammany Hall leader John F. Curry joined to support Al Smith's candidacy for President of the United States over Franklin D. Roosevelt; after Roosevelt's triumph over Smith in the 1932 Democratic National Convention, the two backed Roosevelt. McCooey continued to serve on the Executive Committee until his death in 1934.

McCooey was brother-in-law of James J. Byrne, a member of the New York State Assembly and Brooklyn Borough President. His son, John H. McCooey, Jr., served as Justice of the New York Supreme Court.

See also

List of United States political families

References

1864 births
1934 deaths
People from Williamsburg, Brooklyn
New York (state) Democrats
Politicians from New York City
American political bosses from New York (state)